Thymus praecox is a species of thyme. A common name is mother of thyme, but "creeping thyme" and "wild thyme" may be used where Thymus serpyllum, which also shares these names, is not found. It is native to central, southern, and western Europe.

Classification 
Thymus praecox is in the genus Thymus belonging to the Serpyllum section. It has sometimes been reclassified as T. polytrichus.

Subspecies and cultivars
Thymus praecox subspecies and cultivars include:
 Thymus praecox subsp. praecox
 Thymus praecox 'Doone Valley' (recently reclassified as a hybrid under the name Thymus 'Doone Valley')
 Thymus praecox 'Minus'
 Thymus praecox 'Pseudolanuginosus'
 Thymus praecox subsp. arcticus (sometimes classified as Thymus polytrichus subsp. britannicus)
 Thymus praecox subsp. arcticus 'Albus' (white moss thyme)
 Thymus praecox subsp. arcticus 'Languinosus' (woolly thyme)
 Thymus praecox subsp. arcticus 'Hall's Woolly'
 Thymus praecox subsp. arcticus 'Pink Chintz' (recently reclassified as Thymus serpyllum 'Pink Chintz')

 Thymus praecox subsp. polytrichus (A. Kern. Ex Borbàs) Jalas. Found in the wild in Bosnia.
 Thymus praecox subsp. skorpilii (Velen.) Jalas. Found in the wild in Bosnia.

Uses

Cultivation
Thymus praecox is cultivated as an ornamental plant, used as an evergreen groundcover in gardens and pots. When maintained at a lower height it is used between paving stones in patios and walkways. It is drought tolerant when established.

This thyme species (and Thymus serpyllum) has escaped cultivation in North America, and is a weed or invasive species in some habitats in the United States.

Cuisine
This thyme has a strong scent similar to Oregano. It can be used in cuisine.

Like other species of thyme, T. praecox is characterized by substantial differences in essential oil composition from plant to plant.  Plants which differ in this way are known as chemotypes and a geographical population will generally contain a mix of chemotypes.  For example, studies of chemotypes in Greenland, Iceland, Norway, England, Scotland, and Ireland show that chemotypes span those countries rather than being geographically localized.  Some of those areas contain greater chemotype diversity than others.

References

praecox
Herbs
Flora of Europe
Garden plants of Europe
Drought-tolerant plants
Groundcovers